Eulima is a genus of small, ectoparasitic sea snails, marine gastropod mollusks in the family Eulimidae.

Eulima is the type genus of the family Eulimidae.

Description
The genus appeared early in the Secondary and became abundant in forms during the Tertiary period.

The shell is in the form of an elongated, towering spiral, which tapers to a fine point. The aperture is ovate and entire with the peristome incomplete behind. The outer lip is thick and even.

"The imperforate shell is subulate, many-whorled, polished, and porcellanous Its spire is usually curved or twisted to one side, bearing on one side only, a series of varices forming ribs internally and marking the position of successive mouths. The apex is acute. The aperture is oval, entire, pointed above, rounded below. The lip is simple and a little thickened. The columellar margin is reflected. The operculum is corneous and pancispiral. Its nucleus is near the inner lip.

The animal shows subulate tentacles, approaching at the base. The eyes are large and nearly sessile. The foot is truncated in front. The foot of Eulima secretes a mucous filament which assists to sustain it in the water. The mentum is bilobed. The opercular lobe is winged on each side. The branchial plume is single."

Species 
Species within the genus Eulima include:

 Eulima acerrima (R. B. Watson, 1883)  (taxon inquirendum)
 Eulima acicularis (A. Adams, 1861)
 Eulima aclis (A. Adams, 1851)  (taxon inquirendum)
 Eulima acutissima (Sowerby, 1866)
 Eulima adamsii (Sowerby, 1866)  (taxon inquirendum)
 Eulima agulhasensis (J. Thiele, 1925)
 Eulima alaskensis (P. Bartsch, 1917)
 Eulima albanyana (W. Turton, 1932)
 Eulima albida (P. Marshall, 1902)
 Eulima almo (P. Bartsch, 1917)
 Eulima amanda (J. Thiele, 1925)
 Eulima amblia (R. B. Watson, 1883)
 Eulima angulosa (F. P. Jousseaume in Fisher-Piette & Nicklès, 1946)
 Eulima angustior (Monterosato fide Paetel, 1887)
 Eulima anonyma, Bouchet & Warén, 1986
 Eulima arcuata, Deshayes, 1850
 Eulima atypha Verrill & Bush, 1900
 Eulima augustoi Nobre, 1937  (taxon inquirendum)
 Eulima australasica Melvill & Standen, 1899
 Eulima badia Watson, 1897
 Eulima balteata (A. Adams, 1864)
 Eulima barthelowi (Bartsch, 1917)
 Eulima bifascialis (A. Adams, 1864)
 Eulima bifasciata d’Orbigny, 1841
 Eulima bilineata Alder, 1848
 Eulima bipartita Mörch, 1860
 Eulima bivittata (H. Adams & A. Adams, 1853)
 Eulima bizona (A. Adams, 1864)
 Eulima breviuscula Dunker, 1875
 Eulima broadbentae (Cotton & Godfrey, 1932)
 Eulima campyla Watson, 1883  (taxon inquirendum)
 Eulima capillastericola Bartsch, 1909  (taxon inquirendum)
 Eulima carolii Dall, 1889 (nomen dubium)
 Eulima chascanon Watson, 1883
 Eulima chaunax Watson, 1883  (taxon inquirendum)
 Eulima chionea Bouchet & Warén, 1986
 Eulima chyta Watson, 1883
 Eulima cinctella (A. Adams, 1864)
 Eulima columnaria May, 1916
 Eulima communis Verkrüzen fide Paetel, 1887 - (nomen nudum)
 Eulima compacta Carpenter, 1864
 Eulima compsa Verrill & Bush, 1900
 Eulima confusa Bouchet & Warén, 1986
 Eulima crassiuscula Dunker fide Paetel, 1887 (temporary name)
 Eulima crossei (Brusina, 1886) (species inquirenda)
 Eulima cylindrata Watson, 1883  (taxon inquirendum)
 Eulima cylindrica Thiele, 1925
 † Eulima danae Tenison Woods, 1879 
 Eulima definita Thiele, 1925
 Eulima dentaliopsis A. Adams, 1861  (taxon inquirendum)
 Eulima dentiens Dunker, 1871
 Eulima devistoma Bouchet & Warén, 1986
 Eulima diaphana Hedley, 1899
 Eulima distincta E. A. Smith, 1904
 Eulima dubia Anton, 1838 (taxon inquirendum)
 Eulima dysnoeta Dautzenberg & Foscher, 1896
 Eulima eburnea A. Adams, 1861
 Eulima elata Thiele, 1925
 Eulima elodia de Folin, 1867  (taxon inquirendum)
 Eulima encopicola Warén & Templado, 1994
 Eulima ephamilla Watson, 1883
 Eulima eurychada Watson, 1883
 Eulima excellens Verkrüzen fide Paetel, 1887
 Eulima fischeri Dautzenberg, 1912 (species inquirenda)
 Eulima flexuosa A. Adams, 1851
 Eulima fricata Hedley, 1907
 Eulima fulvocincta C. B. Adams, 1850
 Eulima fuscescens E. A. Smith, 1890
 Eulima fuscostrigata Carpenter, 1864
 Eulima fuscozonata Bouchet & Warén, 1986
 Eulima gentilomiana Issel, 1869 (species inquirenda)
 Eulima germana E. A. Smith, 1890
 Eulima gibba de Folin, 1867
 Eulima glabra (da Costa, 1778)
 Eulima gomphus Watson, 1883
 Eulima gracilenta (A. Adams, 1864)
 Eulima grimaldii Bouchet & Warén, 1986
 † Eulima hampdenensis Laws, 1935 
 Eulima hastata (A. Adams, 1864)
 Eulima healeyi (Strong & Hertlein, 1939)
 Eulima hians Watson, 1883
 Eulima hyalina Watson, 1883
 Eulima inca (Bartsch, 1926)
 Eulima incerta Anton, 1838
 Eulima incolor Warén, A. & Ph. Bouchet, 1986
 † Eulima incondita Marwick, 1931 
 Eulima inconspicua Watson, 1891 (species inquirenda)
 Eulima indeflexa A. Adams, 1861
 Eulima iota C. B. Adams, 1852
 Eulima jaculum (Pilsbry & Lowe, 1932)
 Eulima koeneni Brusina, 1893
 Eulima labiosa Sowerby, 1834
 Eulima lacca Kuroda & Habe, 1971
 Eulima lactea A. Adams, 1854
 Eulima langleyi Sowerby, 1892
 Eulima lapazana (Bartsch, 1917)
 Eulima latipes Watson, 1883
 Eulima leachi (A. Adams, 1861)
 Eulima legrandi Beddome, 1883
 Eulima leptostoma E. A. Smith, 1910
 Eulima leptozona Dautzenberg & Fischer H., 1896
 Eulima lodderae (Tate MS, Lodder, 1900)
 Eulima major (Sowerby, 1834)
 Eulima malayana Thiele, 1925
 Eulima manzoniana Issel, 1869
 Eulima minuscula Turton, 1932
 Eulima mioacutissima (Sacco, 1892)
 Eulima modicella A. Adams, 1851
 Eulima montagueana Iredale, 1914
 Eulima mulata Rios & Absalao, 1990
 Eulima newtoni Brusina, 1893
 Eulima nitidula Deshayes, 1850  (taxon inquirendum)
 † Eulima obliqua (Hutton, 1885) 
 Eulima oblonga Boettger, 1893
 Eulima obtusa de Folin, 1870  (taxon inquirendum)
 Eulima pachychila Boettger, 1893
 Eulima padangensis (Thiele, 1925)
 Eulima panamensis (Bartsch, 1917)
 Eulima parva Sowerby, 1866
 Eulima patula Dall & Simpson, 1901
 Eulima peracuta Thiele, 1925
 Eulima perspicua (W. R. B. Oliver, 1915)
 Eulima petterdi Beddome, 1883
 Eulima philippiana Dunker, 1860
 Eulima philippii Weinkauff, 1868
 Eulima picturata (A. Adams, 1864)
 Eulima politissima Newton, 1895
 Eulima psila Watson, 1883
 Eulima pusilla (A. Adams, 1864)
 Eulima pyramidalis A. Adams, 1851
 Eulima raymondi Rivers, 1904
 Eulima reclinata A. Adams, 1861
 Eulima recta C. B. Adams, 1852
 Eulima recurva Boettger, 1893
 Eulima riss Cantraine, 1835
 Eulima salsa (Bartsch, 1926)
 Eulima sarsi Bush, 1909
 Eulima scitula A. Adams, 1861
 Eulima semitorta A. Adams, 1861
 Eulima similis Thiele, 1925
 Eulima simplex Sowerby, 1897
 Eulima strongylostoma Bouchet & Warén, 1986
 Eulima stylata A. Adams, 1861
 Eulima subconica E. A. Smith, 1890
 Eulima subula d'Orbigny, 1852
 Eulima sumatrensis Thiele, 1925
 Eulima taeniata (A. Adams, 1864)
 Eulima tantilla (A. Adams, 1861)
 † Eulima taurinensis (Sacco, 1892) 
 Eulima tenisoni Tryon, 1886
 Eulima tornata (Thiele, 1925)
 Eulima townsendi (Bartsch, 1917)
 Eulima translucida E. A. Smith, 1901
 † Eulima treadwelli Hutton, 1893 
 Eulima triggi Cotton & Godfrey, 1932
 Eulima tristis Thiele, 1925
 Eulima tsushimensis Takano, Kimura & Kano, 2020
 Eulima tulearensis Lamy, 1910  (taxon inquirendum)
 Eulima turgidula (A. Adams, 1861)
 Eulima undulosa de Folin, 1893 (nomen dubium)
 Eulima unilineata (Adams & Reeve, 1850)
 Eulima valida A. Adams, 1861
 Eulima varians Sowerby, 1834
 Eulima venusta Pease, 1868
 Eulima victoriae Gatliff & Gabriel, 1914

References

 Risso A. (1826-1827). Histoire naturelle des principales productions de l'Europe Méridionale et particulièrement de celles des environs de Nice et des Alpes Maritimes. Paris, Levrault: Vol. 1: XII + 448 + 1 carta [1826]. Vol. 2: VII + 482 + 8 pl. (fiori) [novembre 1827]. Vol. 3: XVI + 480 + 14 pl. (pesci) [settembre 1827]. Vol. 4: IV + 439 + 12 pl. (molluschi) [novembre 1826]. Vol. 5: VIII + 400 + 10 pl. (altri invertebrati)

External links
 Nomenclator Zoologicus info
 Warén A. (1984) A generic revision of the family Eulimidae (Gastropoda, Prosobranchia). Journal of Molluscan Studies suppl. 13: 1-96. page(s): 43
 Gofas, S.; Le Renard, J.; Bouchet, P. (2001). Mollusca, in: Costello, M.J. et al. (Ed.) (2001). European register of marine species: a check-list of the marine species in Europe and a bibliography of guides to their identification. Collection Patrimoines Naturels, 50: pp. 180–213

 
Eulimidae
Taxa named by Antoine Risso